Károly Nagy (6 December 1797 – 2 March 1868) was a Hungarian astronomer, mathematician, chemist and politician. His observatory in Bicske was one of the most well-equipped observatories of Europe in the 19th century. It was destroyed during World War I. Only its main tower stands now.

Life 

Nagy's proponent was Kázmér the minister for foreign affairs in the Cabinet of Bertalan Szemere, the Prime Minister of Hungary at that time. After the Hungarian Revolution of 1848, he was imprisoned in the "Hungarian Bastille" Újépület. He offered his estate and his observatory to the Austrian emperor. Soon after he emigrated to Paris. He was the first Hungarian scientist who met an American president, Andrew Jackson, and the first Hungarian traveler, who wrote detailed coverage of the life of the Native Americans.

Honors 
Asteroid 115059 Nagykároly, discovered by Krisztián Sárneczky and Brigitta Sipőcz at Piszkéstető Station in 2003, was named in his memory. The official  was published by the Minor Planet Center on 23 September 2010.

References 
 

1797 births
1868 deaths
People from Komárno
Hungarian Calvinist and Reformed Christians
19th-century Hungarian astronomers